Al-Shaykh Saad is a Syrian village in the Tartus District in Tartous Governorate. According to the Syria Central Bureau of Statistics (CBS), Al-Shaykh Saad had a population of 4,046 in the 2004 census.

References

Alawite communities in Syria
Populated places in Tartus District